Crataegus cuneata is a species of hawthorn known by the common names Chinese hawthorn or Japanese hawthorn. It is native to China, and is widely cultivated in Japan. It is used for bonsai. The fruit can be red or yellow. Its habitats include valleys and thickets.

Images

References

External links
Bonsai Specimens

cuneata
Flora of China
Taxa named by Joseph Gerhard Zuccarini